The following is a catalogue of characters from The Passage, a series of novels by author Justin Cronin. This series currently consists of The Passage, published in 2010, The Twelve, published in 2012, and The City of Mirrors, published 2016. The Passage (TV series) began adapting the novels in 2019.

Main character

Amy Harper Bellafonte 
aka "The Girl From Nowhere".  Amy is the daughter of Bill Reynolds and Jeanette Bellafonte. Her mother abandons her at a convent, where she forms a bond with one of the nuns, Sister Lacey Antoinette Kudoto. Amy is quickly targeted as a test subject by the secret government program known as Project Noah, and is subsequently kidnapped by Bradford Wolgast and Philip Doyle, but they eventually decide to turn themselves in to save her. However, Richards manages to kidnap all three of them and Amy is given the final, refined version of the virus.

Amy's race was changed from white to black in the TV series adaptation, and her age at the start when she is kidnapped was changed from six to ten. She was also not abandoned at a convent: in the TV series her mother died of a drug overdose and she was taken into foster care.

When the original master Virals break out of the Colorado facility, Amy is rescued by Wolgast and resides with him in an abandoned summer camp in Oregon. After Wolgast supposedly dies from radiation poisoning, she resides with an unnamed family, and later an unnamed woman (both caretakers later implied to have been killed in a Viral attack). She then wanders alone throughout the North American Pacific region for decades, eventually settling in the vicinity of the First Colony, in Southern California. When she comes to First Colony she still looks like a teenager and has the ability to recover from serious wounds amazingly quickly. Amy only talks through her mind for a period, telepathically. She can also communicate with animals and the virals. When she does begin speaking, her behavior and communication style comes across as quirky and slightly "off" to the members of the First Colony (likely due to prolonged lack of contact with other humans). It is also revealed that the Twelve and Zero know of her, and seem to be searching for her. A tracking chip is found embedded in her neck, and she travels with the First Colony Apostles to find the broadcast location. She eventually locates the original Colorado facility where Lacey has taken up residence, and is given the remaining strains of the virus. Following Lacey's sacrifice, Babcock's death and Alicia's transformation, Amy chooses to burn the viral strains.

Amy begins to work at an orphanage in the Texas Republic until she is overcome by severe abdominal pain. She travels with Greer to visit Carter and then to The Homeland. After her visit with Carter she appears as a fully adult woman. She poses as the leader of the insurgency in order to get close to the Twelve. At her staged execution, Amy transforms into a viral and with the help of the viral Brad Wolgast, attacks the Twelve (who number ten because Carter is not with them.) Towards the end of the second novel, Amy reveals she is in love, implying it is with Peter, when saying a final farewell to Wolgast, and she comes to terms with letting Wolgast go (to heaven).

In City of Mirrors, Amy is revealed to have confined herself, along with Carter, within the Chevron Mariner, a large ship caught in the wreckage of Houston, Texas. Lucius Greer, whom she communicates with telepathically despite her mutated state, regularly feeds the both of them with his own blood while they remained trapped in the depths of the boat. Due to the Mariner's position amidst the flooded swamps that once comprised Houston, Tim Fanning, the last of the original infected and Patient Zero for the virus, cannot locate her. Amy spends 21 years trapped in the vessel, while her mind travels to a surreal location implied to be purgatory, where she and Carter spend their time together caring for a garden. She is eventually released after Greer, Michael, and Peter travel to the Mariner to free her due to Fanning's infected moving upon Kerrville, Texas. Using the same method that Fanning accidentally happened upon to return her to a human form, Greer and Michael drown her in the swamp after she is released. The water alters her form back to that of a young human woman, and together they attempt to defend Kerrville from Fanning. Amy attempts to use Carter's remaining viral army to deflect Fanning, but Fanning ambushes the city from underground and slaughters almost all of its occupants. After losing Carter's army to sunlight, Amy opts not to flee the continent aboard the Bergensfjord, instead choosing to confront Fanning in New York City. Once there, she and Peter confront Fanning, during which Peter becomes infected and transforms into a viral. Amy eventually kills Fanning by hanging him with a chain while the two are suspended upon a falling construction crane. Afterwards, she uses her blood to make Peter a viral of her own, and the 2 disappear from history. 1,000 years after the viral plague has decimated the world, an elderly and dying Amy is discovered by Logan, a descendant of Caleb Jaxon, with whom she shares the full story of her journey before passing away.

Before Virus Characters

Jonas Lear
A professor who is first introduced in the original novel as the senior researcher of the virus at the Colorado compound. Lear specifically requests Bradford Wolgast bring a young girl to the research facility, later determined to be Amy Harper Bellafonte. In subsequent novels, Lear's background is expanded upon and it is revealed he was a college student with Professor Tim Fanning in the 1990s, developing a friendship with the latter that would lead to Fanning's eventual infection during a research trip. Lear's wife, Elizabeth, plays a pivotal role in both Lear's development of the virus and Professor Fanning's motivations throughout the series.

Richards
The man in charge at the Colorado compound that houses the 12. At the start he kidnaps Amy, Brad and Phil. He then murders all remaining nuns at the convent in Memphis where Amy is taken by Brad and Phil, and is later killed by Carter during the escape from the Colorado compound.

Bradford Wolgast 
FBI agent whose job is to procure people, mostly death row inmates, to be used as experimental subjects by the Government and/or Military agents experimenting with the virus (possibly United States Army Medical Research Institute for Infectious Diseases (USAMRIID), the Homeland Security Agency, or the National Security Agency (NSA)). His final assignment is to kidnap Amy from convent in Memphis. He does so, but regrets this decision and wants to save Amy instead. Is kidnapped, along with Phil Doyle and Amy, by Richards and held prisoner at the Colorado compound. Eventually rescues Amy and flees to an abandoned summer camp in Oregon, where they wait out the end of the world. When a nuclear bomb explodes within range of Wolgast and Amy, Wolgast is believed to have died from the fallout. He is, however, shown to be a viral at the end of the book, as he embraces Amy when she calls for him to come to her. Alicia observes this from the wall; she keeps the meeting a secret to protect Amy. Wolgast is revealed to be a viral under the chain of virals leading from Carter.  However, he remains primarily loyal to Amy and is able to act independently even against Carter's wishes.  At the climax of the book, he masquerades as Carter to appear at a gathering of the other 10 survivors of the twelve and kills them (and himself) with a bomb.

Philip Doyle 
Wolgast's partner, who objects to Wolgast's attempts to escape with Amy initially, but eventually joins Wolgast in attempting to turn themselves in to civilian police. Doyle also helps Wolgast and Amy escape the Colorado compound. Doyle is killed by Carter in the escape.

Lacey Antoinette Kudoto 
Sister Lacey Antoinette Kudoto is a Sierra Leone-born nun living in a convent in Memphis, Tennessee. When Amy's mother abandons her at the convent, it is primarily Lacey who cares for her until Wolgast and Doyle take her away. Unwilling to let Amy go, and inspired by a divine voice, she travels to the Colorado compound. She arrives at the Chalet just as the virals have broken out of their cells. In the confusion, she assists Wolgast in rescuing Amy from confinement, but is bitten by Carter as they are making their escape. However, she is saved by a serum created by Jonas Lear that effectively neutralizes the virus and provides only the benefit of unnatural long life, similarly to Amy. Over time, she falls in love with Lear, and they live in a cabin on the grounds of the compound for almost a century, awaiting Amy's return. This is where Peter, Michael, Lish, Amy, and Greer find her 97 years later. She reveals to them that she and Lear set up the radio beacon that Michael first heard in California, which led the group to Colorado, as well as the backstory of how the virals were created. As Babcock and his many approach, she lures him into a tunnel under the compound, detonating a small nuclear device left by the Army as a failsafe device, sacrificing herself while killing Babcock and his many that have surrounded the group at the cabin.

Lawrence Grey 
A sweeper who works in the Colorado compound, he is urged by Subject Zero to open the viral's cells to set them loose. Grey is a convicted child sex offender, made docile with regular Depo-Provera hormone injections as part of his probation condition, and whom Zero convinces telepathically to get close enough to Zero. Zero bites Grey on the shoulder making him Zero's familiar.  He is seen by Wolgast and Amy when they escape the facility stumbling through the hallways, blood pouring out of the wound. Grey wakes up in a motel room several weeks after the escape of the virals. He is strangely rejuvenated and meets a highly distraught pregnant doctor named Lila (the ex-wife of Brad Wolgast.) They travel together until they are captured by Horace Guilder. Guilder and his staff feed off Grey's blood for almost 100 years in order to remain young. Both Grey and Lila are presumed dead after they detonate a room full of ether, though the book states simply that their fates are forever unknown.

Bernard Kittridge 
A former Marine Corps Staff Sergeant with one missing leg who was famous as Last Stand in Denver based on videos he posted online as he killed virals with a sniper rifle in his fortified high rise. After the power fails he escapes and meets up with two teenagers and a mentally challenged school bus driver named Danny. He helps them and some others escape to a refugee center in Iowa. He develops a romantic attachment to one of the teens, April Donadio. When the center is overrun by virals, he and April's brother, Tim are killed. It is implied that he and April are ancestors of Alicia Donadio.

First Colony characters

Peter Jaxon 
Theo's younger brother, who leaves with the other First Colony members for Colorado. Son of Demetrius and Prudence Jaxon. After living in his brother's shadow his entire life, he realizes that his mother did not view him as the weaker of the two. Amy initially communicates with him telepathically until she remembers how to speak. Over the course of the book his personality darkens, his mounting responsibilities weighing heavy on his mind. He has a love for Alicia Donadio, who trusts him implicitly. He plans to infect himself with the virus in an attempt to more effectively fight off the other main virals but is stopped by Amy.

He joins the Expeditionary of the Texas Republic, going on missions to locate and kill the remaining Twelve virals. While trying to kill Martinez in Carlsbad Caverns, Peter and Alicia discover Martinez has left. The mission goes wrong and soldiers are killed, leading the military command to give up the hunt for the Twelve and to reassign Peter and Alicia. Peter is reassigned to the Oil Road, defending shipments of oil between Kerrville and Freeport. He reconnects with Michael Fischer, who is an Oiler. On a return trip to Kerrville, they are attacked by the Homeland.

Working covertly and AWOL, Peter finds Tifty Lamont, and discovers the truth about the Massacre in the Field and the Homeland in Iowa. To convince Tifty to take Peter and others there, he engages in the Trade's own version of viral combat, which usually involves putting on armor and fighting a dopey with a blade weapon. Peter, however, takes on a full drak, almost getting killed but winning at the last minute by looking her in the eyes. They travel to the Homeland, helping the insurgency and destroying Twelve, but also supposedly losing Amy.

In City of Mirrors, Peter has adopted his nephew Caleb and Peter works as a carpenter. Due to his celebrity status and leadership skills, President Victoria Sanchez convinces him to join her administration. Two decades later, Peter has led Kerrville to begin relocating to townships outside the walls and had become President himself. Fanning send his viral army to attack and wipes out most of the Texas population. Peter leads the remaining group of survivors to the Bergensfjord, where they escape. Peter leaves with Michael, Alicia, and Amy for New York, to kill Fanning. Fanning bites Peter, turning him into a viral, but Amy kills Fanning and turns Peter into her own viral. They spend the remainder of their lives traveling together until Peter dies and Amy settles on the West Coast.

Theo Jaxon 
Peter's older brother, the one whom Michael initially confides in about the colony's failing power source. Trying to live up to his father's image, he comes to realize he does not want to be a hero but instead settle down. For a time he is unaware that Mausami is carrying his child. When he, Alicia, Peter, and Caleb flee from chasing Virals, he is taken in the mall but later found alive at the Haven compound. He escapes with the First Colony apostles to go to Colorado, but along the way decides to stay at a house with Mausami to raise their child. Theo and Mausami eventually abandon the farmstead where their son, Caleb Jaxon, was born. They travel to Kerrville, Texas, where virals sent from Homeland kill both Theo and Mausami shortly after they arrive. Their deaths are not shown in the books, occurring between The Passage and The Twelve.

Alicia Donadio 
Nicknamed "Lish" or "Blades", Alicia is a tough and sometimes reckless woman who was raised by the Colonel after the events of Dark Night made her an orphan. She has an incredible aptitude for combat with a history of taking out 3 virals at once. After that event she started carrying 3 blades with her at all times. When Amy arrives at the colony, Alicia jumps over the wall to retrieve her and bring her to safety amid a group of bloodthirsty virals. She is later persecuted for this seeming act of bravery, as her actions result in the death of Teacher, a revered member of the colony. After this, she travels with the Apostles. Alicia is in love with Peter and his feelings are mutual, although neither recognizes this explicitly until she joins the Second Expeditionary. When she is fatally wounded in the battle with Babcock's Many, Peter infects her with the virus, which makes her abnormally strong and fast, although she is unable to communicate with the virals as Amy can.

Alicia eventually learns that she carries the strain from Tim Fanning, Patient Zero of the viral plague. Fanning calls to her from New York City, where she travels on her own with the intent to kill him and end the plague once and for all. Along the way, she gives birth to a stillborn daughter, a product of her rape at the hands of the guards at Homeland. However, upon her arrival, Fanning reveals to her that as she is a part of him, she cannot kill him and is physically incapable of causing him any harm. He convinces her that if she remains with him in New York, he will not attack Kerrville, but eventually reneges upon his promise and begins his march upon the city. After disappearing for 21 years, she reappears at Kerrville and attempts to negotiate the exchange of Amy for the safety of Kerrville with Peter. However, Peter refuses her offer and insists upon a classical defense rather than "negotiating" with Fanning. He imprisons her, and Kerrville falls. After the Bergensfjord carries the remnants of humanity to safety, Alicia travels with Peter, Amy, and Michael to New York City to confront Fanning. Alicia travels with Michael and attempts to bomb the underground to flood the subway system and kill Fanning. The bomb destroys the structural integrity of the entire city, causing buildings to collapse and the entire city to become unstable. Alicia is washed away from Michael during the chaos, but survives after washing up in a park. Though Michael searches for her, Alicia does not respond to his calls. Eventually, after watching him depart upon the Nautilus, Alicia discovers that her viral infection is gone. She decides to commit suicide rather than continue on, leaping from the top of a skyscraper in New York to her death, reuniting with her deceased daughter.

Michael Fisher 
Sara's brother, a talented technician nicknamed "Circuit" and later, "Lugnut," who often finds himself butting heads with Alicia. He decodes a radio signal sending a continuous message to bring Amy back to Colorado if anyone finds her, spurring an expedition there; Peter accompanies him. Over the course of their journey, Michael becomes noticeably braver and ends up aiding Peter in a deadly mission to kill the other virals. Michael now works on oil rigs in Texas with girlfriend Lore. Peter arrives to coordinate the security of an oil convoy. When the convoy is attacked by virals from The Homeland, Michael and Lore find themselves embroiled in the liberation of The Homeland.

Michael's curious nature and desire to know of the world beyond the continent eventually inspire him to take to sailing the ocean aboard his boat, the Nautilus. While doing so, he discovers the derelict Bergensfjord, a foreign trade ship that beached near the Gulf of Mexico after its occupants committed suicide decades before. Uncovering evidence of islands the crew had discovered and may have been heading to for safety, Michael spends the next 21 years repairing the Bergensfjord, after Greer discloses to him that the viral plague is not gone as everyone believes. Though he succeeds in completing the repairs and seeing the ship to sea, Michael decides to aid Peter and Amy in confronting Fanning. He and Alicia attempt to sabotage the subway system of New York City, intending to flood the underground and kill Fanning. He and Alicia are separated after the bomb causes the entire city to begin falling apart, and Michael is wounded while trying to get to safety. After Fanning is killed, Michael does not manage to locate Alicia amidst the ruins, and he and Amy part ways, with Michael heading off into the unknown aboard the Nautilus while Amy heads deeper into the American continent. Michael is last seen heading north, uninterested in finding the islands humanity has now settled upon, and instead deciding to try his luck and reach Europe to see what happened on the other continents for himself. His ultimate fate, and whether or not he ever succeeded in traversing the ocean or ever reestablished contact with the others, is never revealed.

Sara Fisher 
Michael's sister, and a nurse. She is in love with Peter, but it is an unrequited love. She tends to Amy when she is first brought to the colony and later joins the Apostles. When they are in Las Vegas she is taken by the virals, but is rescued shortly after and is taken to the Haven. She then rejoins the journey to the Colorado compound with the rest of the Apostles, but after killing Babcock ends up heading to Roswell. At the end of the book, it is revealed that Sara is pregnant with Hollis's child. Sara is a major character in "The Twelve".  She has been kidnapped and taken to The Homeland in Iowa, where she gives birth prematurely and is told that her daughter has been lost.  She works in concentration camp conditions for several years until her death is faked by a resistance organization.  Renamed Dani, she infiltrates the city leadership as a personal assistant / nanny and discovers that her daughter, who she named Kate but who is known as 'Eva', is still alive.  At the end of the book, she, Hollis and her daughter are reunited; Sara then marries Hollis.

In Texas, she hopes to use her meager nursing skills to help in the hospital, but discovers her training is at a level that she may serve as a doctor in the Kerrville hospital. As a doctor, she delivers babies and meets a couple who have a daughter, but already have two older children, requiring an extra birth right certificate. Sara decides to sell her certificate so the couple can keep the little girl. She sees the girl again, 20 years later.

As a doctor, she makes frequent visits to the orphanage to check on the children. While there, she meets Pim, a deaf and mute adolescent who has escaped an abusive situation. Sara and Hollis adopt Pim as their daughter.

Hollis Wilson 
Twin brother of Arlo, he rode with Theo and Peter's father on long expeditions years before and has experience beyond First Colony. When Arlo was turned, Hollis was forced to kill him to protect the Sanctuary. After this, he goes with the Apostles. Has a relationship with Sara and is the father of her child, Kate. He married Sara at the end of The Twelve.

Mausami Patal 
The daughter of household Sanjay Patal and Gloria Patal. She loves Theo and carries his child but marries Galen Strauss in an attempt to make Theo jealous. After Theo's apparent death, she decides to leave First Colony and ends up traveling with the Apostles. Mausami eventually births Caleb Jaxon, and travels with Theo to Kerrville, Texas. She along with Theo perish from an attack conducted by Homeland between the events of The Passage and The Twelve.

Sanjay Patal 
The head of the household in First Colony, he is one of the weaker-minded inhabitants and is the first to foreshadow Babcock's plans. As a child, Sanjay had thoughts of Babcock as well as a recurring dream. During the events of The Night of Blades and Stars, he kills Old Chou under Babcock's influence. He hates the Jaxon family and is relieved when his daughter chooses not to marry Theo. He is presumed killed or infected when the lights of First Colony were turned off.

Caleb Jones 
First found being chased by virals, Caleb travels back to First Colony, and is the one who opens the gate for Amy and Alicia. He is often called "Hightop" due to his shoes. He and Alicia have a special bond, as both of them were orphaned by the events of Dark Night. He travels with the apostles until he meets an untimely end at the hands of Jude in Caliente, NV. Caleb Jaxon, Theo and Mausami's child, is named in honor of him.

Galen Strauss 
A member of the First Colony watch, Galen experiences progressive loss of vision—he suffers from severe glaucoma, which renders him almost entirely blind. He marries Mausami, who then gets pregnant by Theo, while Galen tries to believe the baby is his. It is revealed he knows the baby is not his right before he is taken up by a viral. He is eventually revealed to have been turned into a viral and kills Mausami's dog and attacks Theo before being killed himself.

The Twelve

Professor Tim Fanning AKA Subject Zero 
Though he is not counted among the Twelve, Zero is responsible for the original outbreak, manipulating Grey into releasing him and the other captive virals. Formerly known as Tim Fanning, he was one of the scientists on the original expedition to research the virus in Bolivia and the first to turn into a "viral." While influencing Grey, he shares his personal memories with him, many of which are sexual escapades with women. Following the outbreak, his presence is felt but never seen.

City of Mirrors reveals that Fanning came from a normal upbringing in Ohio, where he showed talents at school, securing him a scholarship to Harvard University. As a young man, Fanning meets with Jonas Lear, a young scientist obsessed with immortality and who eventually discovers the vampire plague in South America. He also meets Lear's first wife, Elizabeth Macomb, with whom he falls in love. Fanning's friendship with Lear and feelings for Liz eventually cause too many conflicting issues and he separates from them for several years, becoming a successful teacher and securing himself great wealth and fame through his papers and discoveries. However, his life again becomes intertwined with Lear and his wife, after Liz contacts him and reveals that she is dying of cancer. Upset that she chose Jonas, who continues to scour the globe searching for some scientific basis for immortality, Fanning and Liz attempt to flee the U.S. and spend her remaining time together. However, Liz dies before she can arrive by train in New York City to flee the country.

Distraught, and convinced that she has abandoned him, Fanning sets out in New York City, encounters a woman at a bar, and circumstances lead them to her home, where Fanning murders her with a kitchen knife after attempting to force himself on her. Finding her baby in the other room, a broken and dismayed Fanning escapes justice and attempts to return to his life. However, the police close in over time, and Fanning, realizing he is doomed, agrees to travel with Lear after being invited to an expedition to South America. During the expedition, Fanning contracts the viral plague, being the first person to do so and survive, thus making him Patient Zero.

The now transformed Fanning, full of hate and spite toward both Lear and God for taking his life and the woman he loved from him, decides to become an "instrument of fate", and accepts his place as a monster meant to purge the earth. He is the first viral to assume a human like form, when he nearly drowns after being thrown into a flooded quarry. Like The Twelve, he possesses telepathic control over the virals carrying his strain, but can also transform between a human form and a monstrous, bat-like creature capable of human speech.

Fanning is eventually killed by Amy after she, Peter, Michael, and Alicia confront him in New York City. After being blinded by sunlight reflected from the mirrors of the Chrysler Building, he is killed when Amy wraps a chain around his neck while she and Peter fight with him atop a collapsing construction site crane. After being killed by the fall and crushed by the remains of the crane, Fanning awakens in another life where he encounters Liz, and the two sit together, reunited in death.

Giles J. Babcock 
The main viral of the first novel, Babcock was a death row inmate convicted of murdering his own abusive mother before becoming infected. He is described as being much larger than the other virals and possesses the ability to influence weak-willed people. While on death row, it was widely whispered that he was dangerously insane and could never stop talking; as a viral he retains this unnerving quirk, never ceasing to make clicking and gurgling noises. Babcock manipulates the weaker-minded First Colony members to kill each other over a three-night period dubbed "The Night of Blades and Stars." Some of those members had been experiencing Babcock's influence since they were children but did not know it. He controls a large group of virals known as The Many as well as controlling some of the citizens of the Haven, from whom he takes human and cattle sacrifices every New Moon.

In the TV series adaptation, the character was changed from male to female and named Shauna Babcock.

Anthony Lloyd Carter 
A death row convict taken by Wolgast at the beginning of the novel. Convicted of drowning his employer, Carter is the only subject who is innocent of his crime. While human, he performed yardwork for a depressed young suburban mother who one day mistakenly suspected Carter of abusing her daughter, and during the struggle fell into and drowned in her swimming pool. Carter realizes at the last moment drowning was her choice. She wanted to die. Carter was innocent. After his transfer from a maximum security prison to the military compound, Carter becomes infected by the virus and kills one of the scientists as well as Richards. He tries killing Kudoto as well but Lear finds her and gives her some of the perfected virus. Following Part I, he becomes one of the Twelve and his whereabouts remain unknown. Carter is set apart from other virals in that he feels remorse for the lives he takes and does not want to harm others, though the virus makes it impossible for him to fight the ultimate urge to kill. Unable to resist the urge to kill, Carter has Wolgast lock him inside the empty hull of an oil container ship outside of Houston.  He remains here through the events of the first two books imagining himself gardening at the home of the mother (Rachel Wood) while her body rises and falls through the swimming pool. During the final battle for Kerrville, Carter transfers his Many to the control of Amy. Carter ultimately sacrifices himself in an attempt to slow down the viral horde and allow the Kerville survivors to escape. His after life consists of him gardening for Rachel Wood and her daughters. He is one of the names honored by Amy at the First Colony.

Julio Martinez 
The tenth Death Row convict and a former attorney. He was sentenced for the seemingly unprovoked murder of a police officer, but during his life it was never discovered that he was actually a serial killer/rapist. His strongest memory is of raping and strangling a waitress named "Louise".  He abandons his familiar Ignacio and forces his viral descendants to die in the sun to take up residence at Guilder's city in Iowa. Alicia forms a special enmity with him, hunting Martinez for a long time before finally killing him at the Homeland. She forces him to repeat Louise's name before finishing him off.

The Haven characters

Jude Cripp 
Originally a "sweep" in the Colorado military research facility, he appears in the story 94 years later as a familiar under the control of Babcock; he is presumed to be the one who interrogated Theo. He is the real leader of Babcock's followers. He has exceptional resilience, and survived having half of his face taken off. He manages to escape in the train, and when they stop at Caliente, Nevada, he surprises the group by popping out of a compartment under the engine. He ends up shooting Caleb before he is killed by Peter and Hollis.

Olson Hand 
The unofficial leader of the Haven, a mysterious Viral-free community. Olsen is genial and good-natured on the surface, but holds a great deal of secrets relating to the Haven's true nature. He's eventually revealed to be little more than a figurehead controlled by Jude. He recruits the First Colonists for his rebellion against Babcock, which goes awry. When his daughter, Mira, dies during the escape from the Haven, he is left unconsolable, and by the next morning, he has wandered off, seemingly in the direction of the Haven.

Mira Hand 
Olson's daughter; at one point, she tries to seduce Michael hoping to become pregnant. While trying to get from the first car to the engine of the train during the escape attempt, she is taken by a viral.

Billie 
A doctor living in the Haven, she treats Michael when the Apostles first make it to Haven. She's later revealed to be part of the group that wants to escape Haven.

Gus 
A mechanic living in the Haven. Laconic and easy-going, he's revealed as a member of the group trying to leave the Haven.

Republic of Texas characters

President Victoria Sanchez 
The current President of the Republic of Texas. She enlists Lucius Greer on a mission to the Homeland.

General Abram Fleet

Dan Karlovic

Lore De Veer 
An 'oiler' who forms a passionate relationship with Michael. She later pilots the ship containing the remainder of humanity to the island refuge that Michael sought in his stead.

Juan "Ceps" Sweeting 
An 'oiler' and friend of Lore and Michael. He commits suicide during Lila's assault on a convoy meant to deliver oil to Kerrville, by igniting the stored oil in one of the tanker trucks. His actions prevent the virals from killing Peter, Michael, and Lore.

Ed Pope 
An 'oiler' who mentored Michael.

Gunnar Apgar  
An Officer of the Expeditionary and Peter Jaxon's direct superior. Apgar becomes the chief military advisor for Peter after he is elected as President of the Republic of Texas at Kerrville. He continues in this position for several decades, and is present when Kerrville falls to Fanning's army. He is later severely wounded and found by Peter, partially crushed and infected, who kills him out of mercy.

Alexander Henneman 
An Officer of the Expeditionary.

Satch Dodd 
Officer, killed in raid. Friend of Peter.

Corporal Muncey 
The radio technician for Vorhees' troop. After being bitten by a Viral, he is granted 'the mercy' by Alicia.

Caleb Jaxon 
The young son of Theo and Mausami. Later adopted by Peter Jaxon after Theo's death. (City of Mirrors) Caleb is a farmer and is married to Pim and has a son Theo and one on the way.

Pim Jaxon 
Adopted daughter of Sara and Hollis, wife to Caleb Jaxon.  Pim is deaf and was horribly abused as a child before being adopted by Sara.  Pim dreamed of Amy and the future much of her life and recorded the dreams in a journal even before meeting Amy. Amy seems to have dreamed of Pim as well.  The journal recorded the 'Island with its five stars' before Kerrville fell and before Pim met Michael.  Pim later hides the journal in a cave on the Island.  It is believed that this became the Book of Amy after it was found on one of the islands though it is not certain.

Duncan "Dunk" Withers 
A childhood friend of Tifty Lamont, now a criminal working for him. (City of Mirrors) He runs the trade.

Lucius Greer 
Major in the Army of the Republic of Texas. Assumes command of the Second Battalion of the Second Expeditionary Forces after the death of General Vorhees. Gives up command to follow Alicia, Michael, Sara, and Hollis when they leave the Second Battalion to reinforce Peter and Amy against the Many. Subsequently, becomes part of the First Colony Apostles by continuing to travel with them after the battle on the mountain. (The Twelve) After returning to Texas he is court martialed and imprisoned for disobeying orders and desertion. Amy frees him and they travel together to The Homeland where he plays a significant role in its liberation. (City of Mirrors) Greer keeps Amy and Carter safe from Zero and aids Michael in his efforts to refurbish a ship that will ultimately take survivors to a safe haven.

Curtis Vorhees 
A Brigadier General in the Army of the Republic of Texas. Vorhees is in command of the Second Battalion of the Second Expeditionary Force stationed at a temporary outpost in Colorado. Vorhees is the ranking officer when Peter's travelling party are captured by the nets deployed by Greer and his squad. He accommodates Peter's party as civilian guests of the Second Expeditionary Force and urges Peter to accept transport to Kerrville, a major populated town in Texas. He accepts Alicia's call to duty when she reveals herself as a sworn member of the First Expeditionary Force and sees her placed into operational rotation. Vorhees is killed in action when he directs an assault on a copper mine entrance suspected of harboring a nest of virals. (The Twelve) Vorhees was a forman at the Northern Agricultural Complex prior to his military career. During an unexpected eclipse his wife (Dee) and daughter (Siri) are killed by virals. His daughter (Nitia) is captured and taken to The Homeland.

Tifty Lamont 
Captain in the Expeditionary and a childhood friend of Curtis Vorhees. He is also the biological father of Vorhees's oldest daughter, Nitia. Tifty is a capable soldier and highly skilled marksman. He leaves the expeditionary to become the head of organized crime within the Republic of Texas. While operating as the head of the Trade, Tifty establishes a science facility where he monitors captured virals to learn everything he can about them. Peter convinces him to take part in the liberation of The Homeland. Tifty agrees and travels to Homeland alongside the others to confront the Twelve and hopefully destroy them. He attempts to kill the Twelve with a suicide bomb vest, but is wounded during the battle at the theater and fails to ignite the explosives. He is found after the battle, missing some of his limbs and mortally wounded. He reveals to Nina that she is actually his biological daughter, taken from Kerrville to Homeland, before passing away. His criminal empire then transfers to Dunk, his less intelligent and amicable underling.

The Homeland

Horace Guilder 
The main antagonist of The Twelve. Guilder is the Deputy Director of the Department of Special Weapons, the government agency that oversaw Project Noah. A lonely and isolated man, Guilder is dying of Lou Gehrig's Disease and desperately hopes to use Lear's research to save his life. Following the outbreak, he succeeds in using Lawrence Grey's infected blood to prolong his life. He creates the 'Homeland', a dictatorship that uses slave labour and is rife with corruption. He keeps Grey locked up as a living 'source' for his continued survival and manipulates Lila Kyle into being his weapon due to her unique ability to control the Virals.

The resistance movement known as 'Sergio' causes him to grow increasingly erratic, paranoid and violent. He makes plans to turn the Homeland into a place for the Twelve Master Virals where they can feed freely on its human denizens. However, Amy fools him into thinking she is the leader of the insurgency, and when he arranges a public execution the insurgency springs a trap on him. At the same time, Lila kills herself along with Lawrence Grey. With the 'source' destroyed, Guilder ages rapidly and ten Master Virals, believing he has purposefully betrayed them, kill him.

Lila Kyle 
A doctor and the ex-wife of Brad Wolgast. At the time of the virus outbreak she is married to David Center & pregnant. After the virus outbreak she suffers a mental breakdown, forever living in a dream world. She meets up with Lawrence Grey, who becomes protective of her despite his criminal past. She is injured in the overrun of a refugee camp where Horace Guilder was holding her and Grey gives her some of his blood to rejuvenate her but the baby is lost. Guilder manipulates her into helping him control the virals and to capture more humans for The Homeland. She seems to gain her sanity at the end of The Twelve, and saves 'Dani' (Sara Fisher), before blowing up the Dome with Grey.

Fred Wilkes 
An older man who helps Horace Guilder to found the Homeland, becoming Guilder's closest advisor and only friend. He ultimately becomes a victim of Guilder's paranoia, and is executed when he refuses to murder a flatlander in cold blood.

Vikraam Suresh 
A scientist who works for Horace Guilder and the Homeland.

Aidan Hoppel 
A former advertising executive now working as Minister of Propaganda for Horace Guilder and the Homeland. Guilder executes him after accusing him of working for the Insurgency.

Vale 
A 'human resources officer' working for the Homeland. Although stern and complicit in the Homeland's brutality, he's considered to be a relatively fair-minded Col.

Sod 
A 'human resources officer' who is infamous in the Homeland for his sadistic sexual appetites. When Alicia is captured by the Homeland, Sod rapes her multiple times as a form of torture. When Alicia convinces him to adjust her restraints, she gains the upper hand and successfully snaps his neck, killing him.

Whistler 
A brutal and sadistic Col nicknamed 'Whistler' due to her congenital deformity that affects her voice. She is killed during a suicide bombing by the Insurgency.

Dr. Verlyn 
A Homeland doctor with a seemingly kindly disposition, Verlyn is responsible for processing new arrivals including Sara Fisher.

Gordon Eustace 
A member of the Expeditionary who was kidnapped by the Homeland along with Sara Fisher at Roswell. He's beaten badly after standing up to his captors, but survives and goes on to found the Insurgency, a rebel group that uses the alias 'Sergio'. With Nina's help, he fakes Sara's death and enlists her to become a mole in the Homeland. Eustace teams up with Amy to overthrow the Homeland, intending to kill Guilder in a suicide attack. The attack fails, but Guilder is killed nonetheless and Eustace marries Nina. Years later, Nina has passed away from illness, as has their infant son. Eustace remains at Homeland as the Sheriff, but finds the people left there to be listless and unwilling to work. He begins to investigate a growing number of disappearances, eventually finding the missing people transformed into virals near Homeland. He and his deputy are attacked, and Eustace is infected and transforms into a viral. Though not seen, he like all others taken by Fanning are released from the infection and die after he is killed in New York,.

Nitia "Nina" Vorhees 
One of the leaders of the insurgency movement known as Sergio. She is second only to Eustace and helps fake Sara's death so she can become a mole for the insurgency. Nina is later revealed to be Nitia Vorhees, daughter-in-name of Curtis Vorhees and biological daughter of Tifty Lamont. Between the events of The Twelve and City of Mirrors, she marries Eustace and bears him a son, but both she and her child are killed some years later by an unknown illness that swept through the Homeland, killing many people. Eustace regularly visits their grave.

References 

Lists of literary characters